Anderson Cardoso de Campos (born 30 March 1997), known as just Anderson Canhoto, is a Brazilian footballer who plays for Ansan Greeners, as a forward.

Career statistics

Club

References

1997 births
Living people
Brazilian footballers
Brazilian expatriate footballers
Association football forwards
Sportspeople from Rio Grande do Sul
Campeonato Brasileiro Série D players
Liga Portugal 2 players
K League 2 players
Clube Esportivo Aimoré players
Associação Chapecoense de Futebol players
Esporte Clube São José players
FC Porto players
FC Porto B players
Esporte Clube Avenida players
Ansan Greeners FC players
Brazilian expatriate sportspeople in Portugal
Brazilian expatriate sportspeople in South Korea
Expatriate footballers in Portugal
Expatriate footballers in South Korea